MarsEdit is a blog post editor for the Mac made by Red Sweater Software. It can be used to write, edit, and publish blog posts, and supports many popular blogging services, such as WordPress, Tumblr, Blogger, and Movable Type.

Features

Composing 

 Rich and Plain Text Editor
 Markdown support, syntax highlighting, and in-line styling
 Spell Checking
 Easy Image and File Uploading
 Automatic Preview Template
 Calendar Based Date Planner
 Fast Live Previews
 Offline Functionality

Service Support 

 Supports many blogging services like Wordpress, tumblr, Blogger and Movable Type
 Sends updates notices to blo.gs, Technorati, and Weblogs.com
 Advanced Wordpress Support

macOS Integration 

 Supports Apple Fullscreen
 Custom “Typewriter Mode” to keep text centered
 Seamless adding of images to posts using IOS devices
 Drag and Drop images from Apple Photos
 MarsEdit Safari Extension to send a page directly to MarsEdit from your browser

Advanced Features 

 Streamlined Micro-posting (Easily post a blog to Twitter)
 Apple Script Support
 Custom HTML Script
 XML-RPC console for debugging server problems
 Backup of all posts and pages locally (for most blog services)

History
MarsEdit was originally developed by Brent Simmons as a component of NetNewsWire, a popular news aggregator for Mac OS X, which, in the 1.0 series, included a simple weblog editor. During the development of NetNewsWire 2.0, the developers decided to move the blog editor functionality to a new application.

With the acquisition of NetNewsWire by NewsGator in 2005, the future of MarsEdit was uncertain for a time. Simmons considered abandoning the app, or open-sourcing it to let other developers work on it, but after a "strong reaction from users", he announced at the October 2005 DrunkenBlog conference that development would continue. On November 4 of 2005, he revealed that MarsEdit development would be continued by Gus Mueller of Flying Meat. In February 2007, MarsEdit was purchased by Red Sweater Software, and development was taken over by Red Sweater's owner, Daniel Jalkut.

Support for the popular Tumblr blog service was added to MarsEdit 2.3 after Jalkut worked with Tumblr developer Marco Arment.

In 2010, an iOS version was planned, but was not released.

In 2018, MarsEdit creator Daniel Jalkut co-formed a group called the "Developer Union" protesting Apple's developer policies. He had previously complained about the Mac App Store taking away developers' control over their app sales.

MarsEdit joined the Setapp subscription package in 2019.

Reception 
Reviews of initial versions of MarsEdit were positive, but pointed out bugs. Version 2 received a 4 out of 5 star review by Macworld magazine, while Ars Technica's David Chartier said it lacked ecto's support for Amazon affiliate links and the built-in Mac OS X Media Browser. In 2007, Engadget's Scott McNulty called it "fantastic" in comparison to Blogger's web interface, and Ars Technica's Jacqui Cheng described it as a "popular blogging tool among Mac users". Scott Gilbertson noted that the app was popular among "a number of" writers for Wired magazine. Weighing the need for MarsEdit compared to using Tumblr's web interface, Christina Warren said that the lower risk of data loss (through saved drafts) and the ease of writing long posts made the app "superior". Macworld praised the new WYSIWYG features version 3.1, but noted that there was missing documentation for self-hosted Movable Type blogs. In 2018, Macworld gave version 4.1 their Editor's Choice award, and rated it 4.5 out of 5 stars; AppleInsider was also positive. In December 2022, Apple blogger John Gruber called it "essential for [his] work".

Release history

References

External links
 MarsEdit web site

Blog software
Blog client software